Ryan Sheridan may refer to:
Ryan Sheridan (musician) (born 1982), Irish singer, songwriter and guitarist
Ryan Sheridan (rugby league) (born 1975), Irish rugby league player and coach